The Khoja-Gaukushan Ensemble is one of the largest architectural complexes in the center of Bukhara. Along with a number of other buildings in central Bukhara, it is included in the UNESCO World Heritage List.

The name Gaukushan means "killing bulls" as the site was previously home to an animal trading area.

The complex includes a madrassa and a mosque with a tall and wide minaret, equal in width to the Khoja Kalon minaret, but shorter.

The complex was built in 1570 during the reign of the Uzbek Khan Abdullah II.

References

Bukhara
Mosques in Bukhara